Sweden was the host of the Eurovision Song Contest 2000 thanks to Charlotte Nilsson's victory the previous year. Sveriges Television chose to hold the contest in Sweden's capital, Stockholm. They were represented by Roger Pontare with the song "When Spirits Are Calling My Name".

Before Eurovision

Melodifestivalen 2000 

Melodifestivalen 2000 was the selection for the 40th song to represent Sweden at the Eurovision Song Contest. It was the 39th time that this system of picking a song had been used; 1,394 songs were submitted to SVT for the competition and 10 progressed to the final. The final was held in the Gothenburg Opera House in Gothenburg on 10 March 2000, and was broadcast on SVT2 and Sveriges Radio's P4 network. Roger Pontare (1994 winner with Marie Bergman) won the MF again with the rock-inspired ballad "När vindarna viskar mitt namn", donning a folk-inspired costume and featuring Sámi dancers during his performance.

The 2000 Melodifestivalen was presented by no less than 10 past participants and winners, who performed a medley of selected Melodifestivalen entries from the past four decades as an interval act. These were Carola Häggkvist, Lotta Engberg, Lena Philipsson, Loa Falkman, Tommy Körberg, Elisabeth Andreassen, Arja Saijonmaa, Lasse Berghagen, Lasse Holm and Björn Skifs. Two of the presenters, Lena Philipsson and Carola Häggkvist, went on to win the Melodifestivalen in 2004 and 2006, respectively (Carola had also won in 1983 and 1991 before). The show was watched by 4,175,000 people, with a total of 525,567 votes cast.

Competing entries

Final

At Eurovision 
Roger performed his song in 18th in the running order, following Croatia and preceding Macedonia, and received much cheers from the home public. The song had been translated into English and was now called "When Spirits Are Calling My Name", and the stage performance featured Native American and Sami themes. At the end of the voting, Sweden received 88 points (including 12 points from Turkey), finishing in 7th place which was enough to qualify them for the next contest as well.

Voting

References

External links
TV broadcastings at SVT's open archive

Further reading 

 

2000
Countries in the Eurovision Song Contest 2000
2000
Eurovision
Eurovision